Ziemnice  is a village in the administrative district of Gmina Osieczna, within Leszno County, Greater Poland Voivodeship, in west-central Poland.

Ziemnice is a newly built village consisting of family villas.

References

Villages in Leszno County